York Central is a parliamentary constituency which is represented in the House of Commons of the UK Parliament by Rachael Maskell of the Labour Party and the Co-operative Party, making it one of only two constituencies (including Middlesbrough) in North Yorkshire not currently represented by the Conservatives.

Constituency profile
The seat covers the historic centre of York which is a significant tourist destination, and surrounding suburbs including Acomb, Clifton and Fishergate. Residents' health and wealth are slightly above the UK averages.

Creation
After the 2005 general election the parliamentary representation in North Yorkshire was reviewed by the Boundary Commission for England, which recommended the division of the former City of York constituency before the 2010 general election leading to two constituencies within the borders of the city of York - York Central is entirely surrounded by York Outer.

York Central is one of only two UK Parliament constituencies to be surrounded by another constituency. The other constituency, Bath, is entirely surrounded by North East Somerset.

Boundaries

York Central is formed from electoral wards from within the city of York.

Acomb
Clifton
Fishergate
Guildhall
Heworth
Holgate
Hull Road
Micklegate
Westfield

Members of Parliament

Elections

Elections in the 2010s

 

 

* Served as an MP in the 2005–2010 Parliament

See also
List of parliamentary constituencies in North Yorkshire

Notes

References

External links
UK Parliament map of the constituency boundary

Politics of York
Parliamentary constituencies in Yorkshire and the Humber
Constituencies of the Parliament of the United Kingdom established in 2010